James Ruse Agricultural High School (colloquially known as Ruse or JR) is a government-funded co-educational academically selective and specialist secondary day school, located in the Sydney suburb of Carlingford, New South Wales, Australia, known for being the highest academically ranked high school in Australia. The school is one of four New South Wales Government agricultural high schools.

The school is especially noted for its academic excellence, ranking 1st out of all New South Wales high schools in 2022 for the 32nd consecutive year since 1991, as well as 1st in the national government NAPLAN tests across Australia since their establishment.

There are approximately 835 students enrolled at James Ruse in Year 7 through to Year 12. James Ruse is an academically selective high school; admission to James Ruse in Year 7 is only through the Selective High Schools Test, which is open to all Year 6 NSW students. A small number of students from other high schools are accepted in Year 9, 10 and 11, through application made directly to the school. In 2019, approximately 97% of the student population came from a language background other than English.

History 
In 1949 the main part of the school grounds was purchased by the NSW Government for the purpose of agricultural education. The school that commenced on this site in 1956 was an annexe of Carlingford District Rural School with Charles Mullavey as the Master in Charge. At that time the school consisted of a wooden five room classroom block, a small staff-room and ablution facilities. By the start of 1958 the school was independent of Carlingford District Rural School and was called the "Carlingford Junior Agricultural High School" (reflecting that students could only undertake the first three years of secondary education at the school).

In 1959 the name of the school was changed to "Carlingford Agricultural High School" (to reflect its new full high school status - although there were no actual Fourth and Fifth Year classes at that time). The first Headmaster, James C. Hoskin, and his Deputy Headmaster, Charles Mullavey, commenced duties at the start of that year and in April, the name of the school changed again - this time to "James Ruse Agricultural High School".

When James Hoskin was studying Agriculture at University, he had become interested in James Ruse due to his significance in the early development of agriculture in Australia, and also because "both Ruse and I [Hoskin] are of Cornish extraction". Hoskin questioned the name of the school (Carlingford Agricultural High School) as the school was not serving just the Carlingford area. In April 1959, Hoskin put forward a proposal to the NSW Department of Education outlining two new names for the school: Sydney Agricultural High School and Ruse Agricultural High School; eventually, the Department agreed to a modification of the latter. The school was named to honour prominent late farmer James Ruse.

Hoskin soon became synonymous with the school, as he served as headmaster until his retirement at age of 65 in 1978. During this time, the school became established as one of the few public schools that were selective; initially because of its agricultural speciality, then for its reputation as a quality school. For his efforts, Hoskin was awarded the Queen's Silver Jubilee Medal in 1977 and the Order of Australia for Services to Education in 1990.

The first group of students to complete the full five years of secondary education at the new high school sat for the Leaving Certificate in 1961. Most of these boys were part of the initial enrolment of 1st Year pupils at the Felton Rd. site, in 1957. James Ruse AHS was originally a boys only school, but gradually became co-educational after an initial intake of 24 female students into Year 11 in 1977.

Since the mid-1990s, James Ruse has undergone an extensive building works program funded by both parents of students and the State and Federal Governments. 1997 saw the completion of Stage 1 of this program (encompassing a new Library block and English classrooms which replaced the old Anderson building, a new block containing Art and HSIE classrooms, the integration of the existing Powe block and the former library into a science block, and the installation of an elevator in the Perrau block to improve wheelchair accessibility).

In 2000, Stage 2 of the program began with the first building (a 180-seat lecture theatre) completed in early 2001. The Schofield block became part of the program in 2002 after the building was damaged by fires. During the next two years the old Technology Block and the Francis block were demolished due to a white ant infestation, with both blocks being rebuilt and refurnished in 2004. The final stage of the works were underway at the time of the departure of Principal Michael Quinlan, who retired in 2006 after having been Principal since 1992. These developments (including a new music block) continued with the guidance of the new principal, Larissa Treskin.

In early 2020, the Powe Science block opened after extensive renovations.

Principals 
The following individuals have served as Principal of James Ruse Agricultural High School:

Academic results 
James Ruse Agricultural High School is noted for its outstanding academic achievements as well as a near perfect record of all students gaining university admission, with many JR alumni forging prominent careers in science, engineering, medicine, law, commerce, and academia.

James Ruse Agricultural High School is ranked 1st out of all Australian secondary schools based on academic results.

The school has outperformed every high school in New South Wales for the past 27 years in public university entrance exams, known in the state as the Higher School Certificate, with a median Universities Admission Index (UAI) of 99.55 in 2004, and 99.20 in 2005 and 2006.

Extracurricular activities 

James Ruse Agricultural High School can be noted for its strong participation in extracurricular and competitive activities, as listed below. In addition, the school has a high level of participation in volunteering and fundraising activities, including World's Greatest Shave and the 40 Hour Famine, and is closely linked with Interact and Amnesty International . Many students have received awards for outstanding participation in community service.

Sport 
The school also holds annual sporting carnivals, including the Swimming, Cross-Country and Athletics Carnivals, where students can compete for participation in wider regional competitions, from Zone and Area carnivals to the CHS (Combined High Schools) competition for the top school teams and competitors in NSW. 
James Ruse participates in a variety of tournaments and competitions with schools in surrounding areas. These include the following activities.
Quad-School Tournament; initiated in 2011, in which the school competes against Baulkham Hills High School, Girraween High School, and as of 2013, Penrith High School in touch football, soccer, basketball, and volleyball over the course of one day. 
Year 7 Gala Day; against Cumberland High School
Year 8 Farmers' Cup; against Muirfield High School
Zone, Regional, or State Representative Teams
There are also many competitive sporting teams, where students compete against other schools in the area, state, or country. Some teams have had the opportunity to compete against sporting teams from overseas.
Knockout Regional Teams (Baseball, Basketball, Hockey, Netball, Soccer, Table Tennis, Touch Football, Tennis, Volleyball)
Summer Grade Sport 
Winter Grade Sport 
Regional Championship Sports
Davidson Shield Cricket Team
CHS Pentathlon
Australian International Junior Circuit (ITTF) Table Tennis Team

James Ruse Agricultural High School Army Cadet Unit (JRAHSACU) 
The cadet unit at James Ruse AHS was established in 1961, and is the largest extra-curricular activity offered at the school. With close to half the students in the school participating, JRAHSACU is one of the largest government school units in Australia. The unit conducts a field expedition (bivouac) every term, with a strong emphasis on navigation, radio telecommunication and hiking. A week-long unit-held Annual Adventurous Activity offers cadets an intense and exotic hiking adventure around Australia. Previous locations included the Cape to Cape Walk, WA; Mt Kosciusko; Kangaroo Island; New Zealand. 

The unit conducts lessons within specialist courses developed by the Training Officer and Cell, where cadets are organised in platoons according to their elective course of choice. Theory lessons are often taught by the section commander, or platoon sergeant at a section level, and Drill lessons are often covered by individual company sergeant majors within company level. In the unit's independently designed specialist training program, cadets become proficient in:

Army drill, dress, and bearing 
Fieldcraft
First aid 
Leadership in the field
Navigation
RATEL (radio telecommunications) 
Survival
Special Operations
Physical training 
Robotics
Engineering

The unit is a part of the 94th Battalion of the 2nd NSW AAC Brigade, and consists of three companies (Alpha, Bravo, Charlie), with three platoon each. Each platoon typically consists of around three sections, usually under the command of a section commander and a second in charge. The current strength of the unit is around 300. The unit currently has a Senior Command of 7 senior cadets, whom possess the rank of Cadet Under Officer (CUO), and the Regimental Sergeant Major holding the rank of Warrant Officer Class 1. The senior command consist of Company Commanders, an Admin Officer, a Logistics Officer and a Training Officer, each role overseeing their respective cells in the unit, as well as organising and planning activities.

Throughout its history, the JRAHSACU has been actively involved in community events, including Hyde Park Memorial Parade, RSL Services, services at local primary schools, and parades in the city. JRAHSACU was awarded the high honour of parading the Duke of Edinburgh's Banner in 2011. The unit participates in annual field exercises held to battalion or brigade (statewide) levels, and has many cadets participate in the annual national Adventure Training Award. An enthusiasm for Cadets continues to exist at rising levels, and the unit has been awarded with numerous formal commendations, unit medals, and Unit Efficiency awards. In 2022, JRAHSACU was featured as the Guard of Honour at the Sydney Hyde Park War Memorial in the online ANZAC service video, made in lieu of the current COVID-19 pandemic, which was released to units and communities around New South Wales.

Music activities 
The following ensembles offer musical training, and some groups perform at both school and public assemblies. Larger ensembles tour NSW annually to perform throughout the state.
School Choir
Jazz Orchestra
Year 7 Concert Band
Wind Orchestra
Symphonic Band
Woodwind Ensemble
Percussion Ensemble
Jazz Ensemble
Annual Musical Production Orchestra
String Orchestra

Agriculture 
Rural Youth (Also known as Rural Ruse), defunct as of 2016
Poultry Squad
Agriculture Enrichment
Garden Crew
Regional Cattle Show Team

Performing arts and visual arts 
Annual School Musical Productions - For over 50 years, James Ruse AHS has been running an annual school musical, with well over a quarter of the whole school community being involved in its making.
Shakespeare Festival - Held to a statewide level, where students compete in areas such as Music, Duologue, Mash-Up, Scene, and Set Design.
Cluster, Region, or State Music/Drama Production
Annual Yearbook Productions
Ruse Publications, publishes the student magazine, RuseStar
Knit Wits
Booklover's Cafe
Ruse Art Club 
Junior and Senior Tropfest Video Teams

Public competitions and other student groups 

ASOR (Astronomical Society of Ruse)
State Debating Teams (Premier's Debating Competition)
Informatics Team (International team members in 2005-6, 2008–15, 2019, 2022).
Physics, Chemistry, Biology and Earth and Environmental National Olympiad Team (International team representatives for Biology [2000-3, 2005-8, 2010, 2016, 2019, 2021], Chemistry [2000-5, 2008-2012, 2015-2021] and Physics [1990, 2004-8, 2010–11, 2015–17, 2019, 2021])
Australian and New Zealand Brain Bee Competition
History Mastermind Competition
Mock Trial
NSW Robotics Programming Team
FIRST Tech Challenge Robotics Team
Mathematics Olympiad Team (International team representatives in 1985-6, 1997-2000, 2003-2017, 2019-2022).
Chess Team
RuseID (Ruse Intranet Development)
Zero Robotics Team
Science Enrichment
Programming Club
Geography (Geoguessr) Club
Tennis Club
Stage Crew
Set Crew
Sound and Lighting Crew
Poultry Squad
Cooking Club

Leadership 
Student Representative Council (S.R.C.) - A student body with 2 representatives elected from each class. 
James Ruse Prefects - A student body composed of seniors elected by the whole school as a group of leading representatives.
James Ruse Peer Support - Elected leaders who help new students settle into the school community.
James Ruse ASPIRE Mentoring Program - A group consisting of volunteers from the Student Representative Council to instill the ASPIRE values into the school.
Australian Army Cadets (James Ruse Agricultural High School Army Cadet Unit - JRAHSACU)
RuseMUN (Ruse Model United Nations)
High Resolves Community Leaders
The Duke of Edinburgh's Award

Welfare programs
Go Green - A group helping to raise awareness for the environment.
James Ruse Save The Children
James Ruse UNICEF Group
James Ruse Amnesty International Association
James Ruse OxFam
Rotary Interact Club
Interschool Christian Fellowship (I.S.C.F)
First Aid Program
Each for Equal

Student Representative Council (SRC) 
The school's Student Representative Council was inaugurated in 1960, making it among the first high schools in New South Wales to have such a body. Each year, each roll class elects a Class Captain and Vice-Captain who represent it on the SRC. Larger extracurricular organisations are also entitled to a representative. The SRC as a whole elect a student executive, which consists of a President, Vice-President, Treasurer, Secretary, and Minutes Secretary, by a system first inaugurated in 1990. Through the SRC, students have some representation on the school steering committees (along with parents and staff), and also play a minor role in decision-making processes relating to curriculum, building plans, and resource allocation. This group is led by five, year-11 student executives.

The council is elected through a first-past-the-post voting system, with a voting card for male and female respectively. This replaced the instant runoff system, which caused gender imbalances in representation. Year Advisors and the school's teacher executives have final oversight over the representatives in this body, and have the power to veto any candidate without their knowledge, giving the position to the candidate with the next highest number of votes.

Agriculture 
The school teaches agriculture as a compulsory subject from years 7 to 10. Formerly it was also compulsory in Year 11 (with students taking an accelerated version of the HSC course to allow completion within one year). However, following the introduction of a new HSC curriculum by the Board of Studies in 2001, the school made Year 11 optional (with the decision supported by a survey among students). Agriculture is a significant part of the school's curriculum, with students undergoing study of the subject both on and off-site, where students study and visit agricultural enterprises both in the Greater Sydney region, with visits to regional horticultural farming enterprises such as the Sydney Royal Easter Show and farms in Bathurst and in Gloucester. There is also great involvement in with other agricultural schools, with the school linked with Yanco Agricultural High School, and previous Head Teacher of Agriculture, Lisle Brown, being the co-author of the Dynamic Agriculture textbook series, which is extensively used in agriculture in Australian schools.

The school leases approximately ten hectares of land from the neighbouring electricity sub-station for use in practical agriculture lessons. The farm land is situated north of the general school buildings, extending north to Lynch Close and east to Jenkins Road. The farm is arranged to include a vegetable garden, a classroom, a glasshouse and nursery, a greenhouse, an orchard, experimental plots, an area for field crops and a livestock section, among others.  It also contains some riparian land which is currently being monitored and undergoing rehabilitation to its native state by the Streamwatch group (currently working as part of Sydney Water Streamwatch).

A significant amount of the farm land is set aside for student plots. Part of practical agriculture lessons involves students growing and maintaining their own crops, and a practical mark worth 10% of their yearly mark is awarded at the end of term. Mature crops in the students' assigned plots of land are then the students' to take home. In addition to its use for educational purposes, the farm also supplies a wide variety of agricultural produce including: Cattle - Angus stud, paraded annually at the Castle Hill Show by the Cattle Group, and sold at Camden Sales yard; Sheep - First-cross Ewes & Prime Lambs; Eggs - Free-range eggs; Poultry Meat - Broilers raised and sold onsite, Oranges - Washington Navel; Peaches - Flordagold and Sherman's Red varieties; Sweet Corn - Shimmer variety; James Ruse Gold Rose - A privately crossbred rose variety the rights were donated to the school in 1999 in celebration of its 40 years of teaching; Apiary - Honey sold on-site in jars; and Macadamia Nuts. Various groups of students have been set up to look after these, such as the Poultry Squad and a Weather Watcher group to maintain farm records. In the past, the farm also housed Merino-Border Leicester sheep, named the Sharlea Sheep. It was replaced by the Aquaculture venture, silver perch and a crayfish growing system. Now some students also participate in making peach jam and sorbet after the peach harvest.

Campus 
The school is situated in Carlingford, a suburb of north-western Sydney. Its main entrance is located on the southwest corner of the school, with a number of smaller entrances on its southern and western boundaries. The campus is built around a main quadrangle, another cluster of buildings around a smaller quadrangle, with an oval, sporting facilities and the farm to the north of these.

Barrengarry House 
Barrengarry House, the school's main administration block is located near the southwest entrance of the school, adjoining the Senior Common Room and the Library and housing the offices of the principal, deputy principals, head teacher of administration and the administration staff on the lower floor, and the counsellor's office, uniform shop and function rooms on the upper floor. It was originally the home and property of the Felton family, and was built in 1885, with the architect thought to have been Charles Slatyer. The block adjoins a roadway of the same name, both of which are named after the Feltons' estate.

J.C. Hoskin Auditorium 
More commonly known as the "school hall", the J.C. Hoskin Auditorium, named after the school's founding principal (see history above), is used as a multi-purpose facility. Along with holding important school assemblies, concerts and the school musical, the hall is also used for examinations (primarily government and senior exams) and it was used for PE classes in the past—this function was largely removed with the construction of the school's new gymnasium in 2017. Ceremonies which celebrate the school's highest achievers are also held annually in the Auditorium.

Library Block 
The Library Block (or "L-Block") was built in 1997 and opened by then NSW Premier Bob Carr as part of the school's building works program, to provide a larger, and more modern and well-equipped library to replace the smaller Shearman Block (now the school's Music block). The block is a two-storey building, with the library occupying the top floor and English classrooms and offices on the bottom floor.

Technology Block 
The Technology Block (or "T-Block") is a recent addition to the school campus along with the new Canteen Block, with construction finished in 2005. The wing is a two-storey building with a mix of classrooms, workshops and modern computer labs, and overlooks the gymnasium on its northern side. To its south is the Art Block.

Art Block 
The Art Block (or "A-Block") is a two storey facility that contains a 5 classrooms. On the lower floor resides the Creative and Performing Arts staffroom, two art classrooms and an art storage room with kilns and other art supplies. On the upper floor are 3 classrooms that are usually used for HSIE lessons such as History, Geography, Commerce and Economics. Due to the sloped nature of the campus, the upper floor adjoins to the first floor of Cameron Block and the lower floor adjoins to the upper floor of the Technology Block.

Cameron Block 
The Cameron Block (or "C-Block") is a three-storey building with a variety of classrooms, science labs, computer rooms and lockers. The second floor is primarily used for Mathematics lessons, and the Mathematics Staffroom is located on the second floor accordingly. On the first floor, rooms C1.1 and C1.2 are science labs, whilst C1.4 and C1.5 are primarily used for HSIE lessons. There is also a Drama Room (C1.3) which contains a stage, as well as a hobbit hole with costumes and other drama-related objects. The topic of Multiple-Disciplinary Communications (MDC) was also formerly taught within the drama room. The HSIE/LOTE staffroom is located between C1.5 and C1.4. The cadets Q-Store is hosted in the exterior of the block.

Powe Block 
The Powe Block (or "P-Block") is a two-storey building connecting L-Block and C-Block which houses most (but not all) of the school's laboratories. It has 5 classrooms. Most science lessons are held in this building and the science faculty staff room is located on the first floor. Its second storey was constructed in 2012.

W-Block 
W-block is a set of 4 separate single-storey buildings. One building contains W1.1 (science lab) and W1.2 (classroom). W1.3 is a band room. W1.4 is partitioned into 5-6 music rooms and one larger classroom. The W-block building nearest to the quadrangle houses several classrooms, and the English Staffroom.

F-Block 
F-Block is a single storey building with two adjoining rooms that houses agriculture lessons. The farm manager utilises this block. It is located on the farm besides the tool shed and behind the basketball courts, and overlooks the peach/orange orchard.

Bishop Block 
Bishop Block is named after John Bishop. It is a 2 storey building adjacent to the canteen sails. The bottom floor is used as a sports equipment storeroom and the second floor is a single classroom often used for Latin or Japanese classes.

Gymnasium 
The JRAHS Gymnasium began construction in late 2016 and opened in 2017. It is the furthest block from Barrengarry House with the exception of the F Block. The Gymnasium currently plays hosts to a majority of Physical Education classes, and can be altered to play volleyball, netball, basketball or futsal. During exam periods, the facility can be converted into an additional exam hall to supplement the J.C. Hoskin Auditorium.

Notable alumni

Business, science, and public service
 Scott Farquhar - co-CEO of Australian software company Atlassian
 Andrew Leigh - economist and Member of the House of Representatives
 Cleo Loi - astrophysicist, mapped atmospheric plasma tubes aligning with Earth's magnetic field
 Elizabeth New - chemist and associate professor at University of Sydney, recipient of RSC Dalton Young Researchers Award
 Dhananjayan (Danny) Sriskandarajah - Rhodes Scholar, Director General of the Royal Commonwealth Society, CEO of CIVICUS: World Alliance for Citizen Participation
 Mark Taylor - Prosecutor and State Member for the Electoral district of Seven Hills
 Justin Wolfers - professor of economics and public policy at the University of Michigan
 Catriona Noble - Former CEO McDonalds Australia
 Eddie Woo - Mathematics teacher known for Wootube, online mathematics lessons
 John Ho - Chairman of Bellamy’s Organic, Board Member of Vocus Group, Founder and Chief Industrialist Investor of Janchor Partners

Entertainment and the arts
 Aravind Adiga - journalist, author, and 2008 Man Booker Prize winner
 Joh Bailey - celebrity hairdresser
 Kate Fagan - (1985-1990) Folk singer and poet
 David Fung - international concert pianist, laureate of the Queen Elisabeth Competition and the 12th Arthur Rubinstein International Piano Masters Competition, Tel Aviv (2008), and winner of the 2002 ABC Symphony Australia Young Performer of the Year Award.
 Antony Green - ABC election analyst and commentator
 Stephen Dziedzic - ABC Foreign Affairs reporter
 Jason Davis (Jabba) - radio and television presenter, actor
 Maha Koraiem - co-founder of swiish.com and co-author of Super Green Smoothies
 Kate O'Toole- Journalist, host of Hack on Triple J 
 Magdalena Roze - television weather presenter and meteorologist
 Katrina Warren - television veterinarian

Military
RADM Trevor Jones  - Deputy Chief of Navy and former chief of staff of Headquarters Australian Forces in Middle East
MAJGEN Mark Kelly  - Repatriation Commissioner and former commander of Australian Forces in Middle East

Sports
 Ron Jackson - swimmer, Gold Medal Winner 1650 yard freestyle Commonwealth Games, Kingston, Jamaica. 1966 (while still at school).
 Natalie Bates - cyclist, 2006 Commonwealth Games gold medalist
 Andrew Leeds - footballer, former member of the Australian National Rugby Union team
 Greg Mail - cricketer, former opening batsman for the New South Wales Blues

Religious
Greg Anderson has been Anglican Bishop of the Northern Territory since 2014.
Chris Edwards has been Anglican Bishop of North Sydney since 2014.
Gary Koo,  has been Anglican Bishop of the Western Region since 2019
Stuart McMillan, President of the Uniting Church in Australia, 2015-18
Steve Chong, founder of RICE Movement, since 2001.

See also 

 List of government schools in New South Wales
 List of selective high schools in New South Wales
 Hurlstone Agricultural High School

References

External links 
 James Ruse Agricultural High School website
 James Ruse Union
 James Ruse Pioneers

Selective schools in New South Wales
Agricultural schools
Educational institutions established in 1958
Public high schools in Sydney
1958 establishments in Australia
Schools in Parramatta